Eli H. Janney (November 12, 1831 – June 16, 1912), aka Eli Hamilton Janney or simply Eli   Janney, was the inventor of the modern knuckle coupler that replaced link and pin couplers on North American railroads.

Biography
He was born in 1831 to Daniel Janney and Elizabeth Avis Haines in Loudoun County, Virginia. He studied briefly at a seminary. He married Cornelia Hamilton (1833–1889).

In the American Civil War, Janney achieved the rank of major for the Confederate States of America, and served on the staff of General Robert E. Lee.

After the war, he was a dry goods clerk in Alexandria, Virginia; he spent many of his lunches whittling his concept out of a block of wood for a replacement to the railroads' link and pin couplers that were in wide use.  On April 1, 1873, Janney filed for a patent titled "Improvement in Car-Couplings" describing the knuckle style couplers that are in use on railroads today.  He was awarded  on April 29, 1873.

He died on June 16, 1912, in Alexandria, Virginia and was buried in Ivy Hill Cemetery.  The City of Alexandria named one of their streets in his honor, Janney's Lane.

Janney's coupler and the Westinghouse air brake are generally regarded as being the two most significant safety inventions in U.S. railroads between the end of the Civil War and 1900.

References

Further reading 
 Railcar Coupler History in North America, by J.H.White at American Heritage Magazine
 CPRR.org (2004), Link and Pin Couplers; includes a scanned copy of the patent application.  Retrieved March 31, 2005.
 Union Pacific Railroad, UP - Chronological History.  Retrieved March 30, 2005 Jim

Patents awarded
  Improved Car Coupling, April 21, 1868
  Improvement in Car-Couplings April 29, 1873
  Improvement in Car-Couplings October 20, 1874
  Improvement in Car-Platforms August 20, 1878
  Improvement in Car-Coupling Draw-Bars August 27, 1876
  Improvement in Car-Couplings February 25, 1879
  Improvement in Car-Buffers April 8, 1879
  Improvement in Car-Buffers May 13, 1879
 
 
 
 
 
 
 
 
 
 
 
 
 

1831 births
1912 deaths
American people in rail transportation
American mechanical engineers
People from Loudoun County, Virginia
People from Alexandria, Virginia
People of Virginia in the American Civil War
Engineers from Virginia